Home Magazine was a magazine published in the United States by Hachette Filipacchi Media U.S.

History and profile
Home was founded in 1981 and concluded publication with the October 2008 issue. The magazine appeared eight times a year and had a circulation of one million. In 2007 Olivia Monjo appointed the editor-in-chief of the magazine. Its website, PointClickHome.com, continued updating until 2009.

References

External links
Official website

Lifestyle magazines published in the United States
Defunct magazines published in the United States
Magazines established in 1981
Magazines disestablished in 2008
Eight times annually magazines published in the United States